The Unitarian Earth Spirit Network (UESN) is an association of Unitarian Universalists based in the U.K. that seeks to represent a Nature/Earth/Creation centred religious voice within the church.  It was assisted by Jo Rogers as Secretary/Treasurer. The UESN provides a forum for this group and became a recognised, credible part of the British Unitarian movement.

History
The UESN was founded in 1990 by Rev. Peter Roberts. It began as a part of the British Unitarian sect known as the "Unitarian Pagan Network."  This name was eventually changed because some members were unhappy with the negative associations they had for the term 'pagan'. For a while, it was known as the "Unitarian New Age Network" until the group settled on their current name, "Unitarian Earth Spirit Network."

Affiliations
In addition to its links to the main British Unitarian community, the organisation maintains ties to the U.S.-based Covenant of Unitarian Universalist Pagans, which serves a similar role of representing contemporary pagan spirituality in the American Unitarian community.

UESN publishes a quarterly newsletter called File, which members receive with an annual subscription.

See also
Modern paganism in the United Kingdom

References

External links
Unitarian Earth Spirit Network Web Site

Unitarianism in the United Kingdom
Modern pagan organisations based in the United Kingdom
Christian organizations established in 1990
1990 establishments in the United Kingdom
Modern pagan organizations established in the 1990s